Ray McKinnon may refer to:

 Ray McKinnon (actor) (born 1957), American actor
 Ray McKinnon (footballer) (born 1970), Scottish football manager and former player